MotorCities National Heritage Area or Motor Cities National Heritage Area is a federally designated National Heritage Area that commemorates and promotes the automobile industry in Metro Detroit, with portions of 16 counties in southern Michigan, United States.

The scope of the heritage area includes sites and events relating to the motor industry as well as the industry's impact on labor, society and the environment. The heritage area comprises more than 1200 automotive-related sites, including the Henry Ford Museum, Fair Lane, various Ford plants, the Automotive Hall of Fame , the Sloan Museum, and the Arab American National Museum.

Counties within the national heritage area includes Saginaw, Clinton, Shiawassee, Genesee, Macomb, Oakland, Livingston, Ingham, Eaton, Kalamazoo, Calhoun, Jackson, Washtenaw, Wayne, Monroe and Lenawee counties.  These counties comprise the Detroit metropolitan area as well as Saginaw, Flint, Lansing, Ann Arbor, Battle Creek, Jackson and Kalamazoo.

The MotorCities National Heritage Area was established on November 6, 1998 as the Automobile National Heritage Area.  The name was  later changed to MotorCities National Heritage Area.

References

External links

 
1998 establishments in Michigan
Protected areas established in 1998